In physics, refraction is the redirection of a wave as it passes from one medium to another. The redirection can be caused by the wave's change in speed or by a change in the medium. Refraction of light is the most commonly observed phenomenon, but other waves such as sound waves and water waves also experience refraction. How much a wave is refracted is determined by the change in wave speed and the initial direction of wave propagation relative to the direction of change in speed.

For light, refraction follows Snell's law, which states that, for a given pair of media, the ratio of the sines of the angle of incidence θ1 and angle of refraction θ2 is equal to the ratio of phase velocities (v1 / v2) in the two media, or equivalently, to the refractive indices (n2 / n1) of the two media.

 

Optical prisms and lenses use refraction to redirect light, as does the human eye. The refractive index of materials varies with the wavelength of light, and thus the angle of the refraction also varies correspondingly. This is called dispersion and causes prisms and rainbows to divide white light into its constituent spectral colors.

Light

Refraction of light can be seen in many places in our everyday life. It makes objects under a water surface appear closer than they really are. It is what optical lenses are based on, allowing for instruments such as glasses, cameras, binoculars, microscopes, and the human eye. Refraction is also responsible for some natural optical phenomena including rainbows and mirages.

General explanation 

A correct explanation of refraction involves two separate parts, both a result of the wave nature of light.

 Light slows as it travels through a medium other than vacuum (such as air, glass or water). This is not because of scattering or absorption. Rather it is because, as an electromagnetic oscillation, light itself causes other electrically charged particles such as electrons, to oscillate. The oscillating electrons emit their own electromagnetic waves  which interact with the original light. The resulting "combined" wave has wave packets that pass an observer at a slower rate. The light has effectively been slowed. When light returns to a vacuum and there are no electrons nearby, this slowing effect ends and its speed returns to c.
 When light enters a slower medium at an angle, one side of the wavefront is slowed before the other. This asymmetrical slowing of the light causes it to change the angle of its travel. Once light is within the new medium with constant properties, it travels in a straight line again.

Explanation for slowing of light in a medium

As described above, the speed of light is slower in a medium other than vacuum. This slowing applies to any medium such as air, water, or glass, and is responsible for phenomena such as refraction. When light leaves the medium and returns to a vacuum, and ignoring any effects of gravity, its speed returns to the usual speed of light in vacuum,  c.

Common explanations for this slowing, based upon the idea of light scattering from, or being absorbed and re-emitted by atoms, are both incorrect. Explanations like these would cause a "blurring" effect in the resulting light, as it would no longer be travelling in just one direction. But this effect is not seen in nature.

A correct explanation rests on light's nature as an electromagnetic wave. Because light is an oscillating electrical/magnetic wave, light traveling in a medium causes the electrically charged electrons of the material to also oscillate. (The material's protons also oscillate but as they are around 2000 times more massive, their movement and therefore their effect, is far smaller). A moving electrical charge emits electromagnetic waves of its own. The electromagnetic waves emitted by the oscillating electrons, interact with the electromagnetic waves that make up the original light, similar to water waves on a pond, a process known as constructive interference. When two waves interfere in this way, the resulting "combined" wave may have wave packets that pass an observer at a slower rate. The light has effectively been slowed. When the light leaves the material, this interaction with electrons no longer happens, and therefore the wave packet rate (and therefore its speed) return to normal.

Explanation for bending of light as it enters and exits a medium

Consider a wave going from one material to another where its speed is slower as in the figure. If it reaches the interface between the materials at an angle one side of the wave will reach the second material first, and therefore slow down earlier. With one side of the wave going slower the whole wave will pivot towards that side. This is why a wave will bend away from the surface or toward the normal when going into a slower material. In the opposite case of a wave reaching a material where the speed is higher, one side of the wave will speed up and the wave will pivot away from that side.

Another way of understanding the same thing is to consider the change in wavelength at the interface. When the wave goes from one material to another where the wave has a different speed v, the frequency f of the wave will stay the same, but the distance between wavefronts or wavelength λ=v/f will change. If the speed is decreased, such as in the figure to the right, the wavelength will also decrease. With an angle between the wave fronts and the interface and change in distance between the wave fronts the angle must change over the interface to keep the wave fronts intact. From these considerations the relationship between the angle of incidence θ1, angle of transmission θ2 and the wave speeds v1 and v2 in the two materials can be derived. This is the law of refraction or Snell's law and can be written as

.

The phenomenon of refraction can in a more fundamental way be derived from the 2 or 3-dimensional wave equation. The boundary condition at the interface will then require the tangential component of the wave vector to be identical on the two sides of the interface. Since the magnitude of the wave vector depend on the wave speed this requires a change in direction of the wave vector.

The relevant wave speed in the discussion above is the phase velocity of the wave. This is typically close to the group velocity which can be seen as the truer speed of a wave, but when they differ it is important to use the phase velocity in all calculations relating to refraction.

A wave traveling perpendicular to a boundary, i.e. having its wavefronts parallel to the boundary, will not change direction even if the speed of the wave changes.

Law of refraction
For light, the refractive index n of a material is more often used than the wave phase speed v in the material. They are, however, directly related through the speed of light in vacuum c as
.
In optics, therefore, the law of refraction is typically written as
.

Refraction in a water surface

Refraction occurs when light goes through a water surface since water has a refractive index of 1.33 and air has a refractive index of about 1. Looking at a straight object, such as a pencil in the figure here, which is placed at a slant, partially in the water, the object appears to bend at the water's surface. This is due to the bending of light rays as they move from the water to the air. Once the rays reach the eye, the eye traces them back as straight lines (lines of sight). The lines of sight (shown as dashed lines) intersect at a higher position than where the actual rays originated. This causes the pencil to appear higher and the water to appear shallower than it really is.

The depth that the water appears to be when viewed from above is known as the apparent depth. This is an important consideration for spearfishing from the surface because it will make the target fish appear to be in a different place, and the fisher must aim lower to catch the fish. Conversely, an object above the water has a higher apparent height when viewed from below the water. The opposite correction must be made by an archer fish.

For small angles of incidence (measured from the normal, when sin θ is approximately the same as tan θ), the ratio of apparent to real depth is the ratio of the refractive indexes of air to that of water. But, as the angle of incidence approaches 90o, the apparent depth approaches zero, albeit reflection increases, which limits observation at high angles of incidence. Conversely, the apparent height approaches infinity as the angle of incidence (from below) increases, but even earlier, as the angle of total internal reflection is approached, albeit the image also fades from view as this limit is approached.

Dispersion
Refraction is also responsible for rainbows and for the splitting of white light into a rainbow-spectrum as it passes through a glass prism. Glass has a higher refractive index than air. When a beam of white light passes from air into a material having an index of refraction that varies with frequency, a phenomenon known as dispersion occurs, in which different coloured components of the white light are refracted at different angles, i.e., they bend by different amounts at the interface, so that they become separated. The different colors correspond to different frequencies.

Atmospheric refraction

The refractive index of air depends on the air density and thus vary with air temperature and pressure. Since the pressure is lower at higher altitudes, the refractive index is also lower, causing light rays to refract towards the earth surface when traveling long distances through the atmosphere. This shifts the apparent positions of stars slightly when they are close to the horizon and makes the sun visible before it geometrically rises above the horizon during a sunrise.

Temperature variations in the air can also cause refraction of light. This can be seen as a heat haze when hot and cold air is mixed e.g. over a fire, in engine exhaust, or when opening a window on a cold day. This makes objects viewed through the mixed air appear to shimmer or move around randomly as the hot and cold air moves. This effect is also visible from normal variations in air temperature during a sunny day when using high magnification telephoto lenses and is often limiting the image quality in these cases.
 In a similar way, atmospheric turbulence gives rapidly varying distortions in the images of astronomical telescopes limiting the resolution of terrestrial telescopes not using adaptive optics or other techniques for overcoming these atmospheric distortions.

Air temperature variations close to the surface can give rise to other optical phenomena, such as mirages and Fata Morgana. Most commonly, air heated by a hot road on a sunny day deflects light approaching at a shallow angle towards a viewer. This makes the road appear reflecting, giving an illusion of water covering the road.

Clinical significance
In medicine, particularly optometry, ophthalmology and orthoptics, refraction (also known as refractometry) is a clinical test in which a phoropter may be used by the appropriate eye care professional to determine the eye's refractive error and the best corrective lenses to be prescribed. A series of test lenses in graded optical powers or focal lengths are presented to determine which provides the sharpest, clearest vision.

Gallery

Mechanical waves

Water waves

Water waves travel slower in shallower water. This can be used to demonstrate refraction in ripple tanks and also explains why waves on a shoreline tend to strike the shore close to a perpendicular angle. As the waves travel from deep water into shallower water near the shore, they are refracted from their original direction of travel to an angle more normal to the shoreline.

Sound waves

In underwater acoustics, refraction is the bending or curving of a sound ray that results when the ray passes through a sound speed gradient from a region of one sound speed to a region of a different speed. The amount of ray bending is dependent on the amount of difference between sound speeds, that is, the variation in temperature, salinity, and pressure of the water.
Similar acoustics effects are also found in the Earth's atmosphere. The phenomenon of refraction of sound in the atmosphere has been known for centuries; however, beginning in the early 1970s, widespread analysis of this effect came into vogue through the designing of urban highways and noise barriers to address the meteorological effects of bending of sound rays in the lower atmosphere.

See also
 Birefringence (double refraction)
 Geometrical optics
 Huygens–Fresnel principle
 List of indices of refraction
 Negative refraction
 Reflection
 Schlieren photography
 Seismic refraction
 Super refraction

References

External links

 Reflections and Refractions in Ray Tracing, a simple but thorough discussion of the mathematics behind refraction and reflection.
 Flash refraction simulation- includes source, Explains refraction and Snell's Law.

 
Physical phenomena
Geometrical optics
Physical optics